For 1976 in television, see:

1976 in American television
1976 in Australian television
1976 in Austrian television
1976 in Belgian television
1976 in Brazilian television
1976 in British television
1976 in Canadian television
1976 in Croatian television
1976 in Danish television
1976 in Dutch television
1976 in Estonian television
1976 in French television
1976 in Irish television
1976 in Japanese television
1976 in New Zealand television
1976 in Scottish television
1976 in Singapore television
1976 in South African television